Kim Ki-Hun (born 27 May 1968) is a retired South Korean javelin thrower.

He won the silver medal at the 1990 Asian Games, the bronze medal at the 1991 Asian Championships and the gold medal at the 1997 East Asian Games. He also competed at the 1991 World Championships, the 1992 Olympic Games and the 1995 World Championships without reaching the final.

His personal best time was 79.08 metres, achieved in April 1992.

References

1968 births
Living people
South Korean male javelin throwers
Athletes (track and field) at the 1992 Summer Olympics
Olympic athletes of South Korea
World Athletics Championships athletes for South Korea
Asian Games silver medalists for South Korea
Asian Games medalists in athletics (track and field)
Medalists at the 1990 Asian Games
Athletes (track and field) at the 1990 Asian Games
Athletes (track and field) at the 1994 Asian Games